Beatrice Kristi Ilejay Laus (born 3 June 2000), known professionally as beabadoobee, is a Filipino-British singer-songwriter. From 2018 to 2021, she released five extended plays under the independent label Dirty Hit: Lice (2018), Patched Up (2018), Loveworm (2019), Space Cadet (2019) and Our Extended Play (2021). Her debut studio album, Fake It Flowers, was released in October 2020 and received critical acclaim. Her second studio album, Beatopia, was released on July 15, 2022.

Beabadoobee served as a supporting act for labelmates The 1975 during several legs of their Music for Cars Tour, as well as American singer Clairo during her Immunity Tour. She was nominated for the Rising Star Award at the 2020 Brit Awards, and was presented with the Radar Award at the 2020 NME Awards. Beabadoobee was also predicted as a breakthrough act for 2020 in an annual BBC poll of music critics, Sound of 2020.

Early life and education
Laus was born in Iloilo City in the Philippines on 3 June 2000 and moved to London with her parents at the age of 3. She grew up in West London listening to original Pinoy music as well as pop and rock music from the 1980s. While she was a teenager, she listened to indie rock including Karen O, Yeah Yeah Yeahs, Florist and Alex G. She was permanently excluded from Sacred Heart High School before completing her thirteenth year at Hammersmith Academy. Laus spent seven years learning to play the violin, before getting her first guitar second-hand at the age of 17. She was under the tutelage of YouTube tutorials produced by other accomplished guitarists. She was inspired by Kimya Dawson and the Juno soundtrack to start making music.

Career

2017–2019: "Coffee" and early EPs
The first song Beabadoobee wrote on her guitar was "Coffee". She released the song as well as a cover of Karen O's "The Moon Song" in September 2017. "Coffee" gained over 300,000 views on YouTube, as well as the attention of Dirty Hit Records. She signed to the label in April 2018. This was followed by the release of her debut EP Lice in March 2018 and her second EP Patched Up in December 2018. In January 2019, Beabadoobee was placed with Billie Eilish on NME's annual list of "essential new artists", the "NME 100". She subsequently released her third EP titled Loveworm. Beabadoobee released an acoustic version of this EP titled Loveworm (Bedroom Sessions) in July 2019.

In September 2019, Beabadoobee embarked on her first tour supporting Clairo on her Immunity Tour, before releasing her fourth EP, Space Cadet, in October 2019. Beabadoobee subsequently made the front cover of NME on 25 October 2019. She was shortlisted for the Rising Star Award at the 2020 Brit Awards in December 2019. In November 2019, Beabadoobee released a pair of Spotify Singles, one being a cover of "Don't You Forget About Me" by Simple Minds as well as a version of "She Plays Bass" recorded in Abbey Road Studios in London. In December 2019, Beabadoobee was longlisted in the annual BBC poll of music critics, Sound of 2020.

2020–present: "Death Bed", Fake-it-Flowers, Our Extended Play, and Beatopia
In February 2020, Beabadoobee performed at the 2020 NME Awards after winning the Radar Award. She supported labelmates the 1975 on their Music for Cars Tour for both the UK leg in February 2020. She was scheduled to also support the band during the North American leg of this tour in April 2020, however it was postponed due to the COVID-19 pandemic.

A sample of Beabadoobee's 2017 debut single "Coffee" was used on Canadian rapper Powfu's 2019 single, "Death Bed (Coffee for Your Head)". The song became a massively successful sleeper hit after going viral on the app TikTok in early 2020, becoming Beabadoobee's first official chart entry in her career, both locally and internationally. By April 2020, it had entered the Top 5 in several countries including the UK, Australia and New Zealand. It earned gold certification status in Belgium, Canada, France, Mexico and New Zealand, as well as Platinum or higher in the US and the UK among several other countries. Speaking about her reaction to the popularization of "Death Bed", Beabadoobee said, "I'm not going to lie, it was overwhelming… I kinda hated it. I hated more people knowing about the first song I'd ever written and not my others. I was so stubborn but I grew into it and accepted that's just how life works. I was extremely grateful for its existence and it's only given me more opportunities."

Beabadoobee announced her debut studio album, Fake It Flowers, and released its lead single "Care" on 14 July 2020. In early August 2020, she released the album's second single, "Sorry", and revealed the album's track listing, cover art and official release date. Beabadoobee released "Worth It" as the third single, "How Was Your Day?" as the fourth single, and "Together" as the fifth and final single of Fake It Flowers. The album was released on 16 October 2020 to critical acclaim and spent one week in the UK Albums Chart at number 8. According to sales in the United States, Billboard ranked Beabadoobee as the Top New Rock Artist of 2020. In 2021, Beabadoobee embarked on a headlining tour of the United Kingdom and Ireland to support the album.

Beabadoobee released the single "Last Day On Earth" on 24 March, produced and co-written by Matty Healy and George Daniel of the 1975. The artist announced that the single is taken from her EP Our Extended Play, which she said that she wrote with her labelmates "on the countryside".

Her second album, Beatopia, was announced on 23 March 2022. It was released on 15 July 2022 through Dirty Hit.

Beabadoobee will be an opening act on multiple shows of the US leg of Taylor Swift's upcoming The Eras Tour.

In January of 2023, Beabadoobee posted the snippet of an unreleased song on Tiktok, which soon went viral across the social media platform. "Glue Song" was later released on Valentine’s Day, 14 February 2023.

Starting in March 2023, Beabadoobee will start touring in Germany, Italy, Luxembourg, Belgium, Norway, Netherlands, Sweden, Denmark.

Artistry and reception
Beabadoobee has cited Elliott Smith, Mac DeMarco, the Moldy Peaches, Pavement, Mazzy Star, the Beatles, Simon and Garfunkel, and Daniel Johnston as her musical influences. She has a tattoo of Johnston's artwork from the cover of his album Continued Story with Texas Instruments.

In a 2018 interview with Vice, she expressed plans to make film soundtracks in the future as they heavily inspired her to make music. On her background and using YouTube to find success, she said:

My very traditional Asian family had the classic way of thinking: 'Play an orchestra-instrument' or 'be a doctor'. Today, people start off making beats on a laptop, but hopefully I encourage young people to pick up the guitar and rock out! YouTube-tutorials are a great way to develop your own style, and go at your own pace.

Taylor Swift, Harry Styles, Khalid, Jaden Smith, and Matty Healy of the 1975 have each expressed their admiration for Beabadoobee.

Personal life
At age 15, Laus began dating British film director Soren Harrison who is known for his works with The 1975 and Måneskin. Their relationship lasted for about seven years, and they broke up in June 2022. In July of 2022, she started dating Jacob Erland, a photographer and director. Laus dedicated "Glue Song" to him, for which Laus and Erland directed the music video.

Discography

Studio albums

Extended plays

Singles

As lead artist

As featured artist

Other charted songs

Tours 
Headlining

Fake It Flowers Tour (2021)
US Tour 2022 (2022)
Beatopia Tour (2022)
Europe Tour 2023 (2023)
US Summer Tour (2023)

Supporting
Clairo - Immunity Tour (2019)
The 1975 - Music for Cars Tour (2020)
Halsey - Love and Power Tour (2022)
Taylor Swift - The Eras Tour (2023)

Awards and nominations

Notes

References

External links
 

2000 births
Living people
21st-century women guitarists
Bisexual musicians
Dirty Hit artists
British indie pop musicians
British indie rock musicians
British folk-pop singers
Filipino rock guitarists
Filipino rock musicians
Filipino British musicians
Filipino emigrants to England
NME Awards winners
Alternative rock musicians
Space rock musicians
People from London
People from Iloilo City
Singers from Iloilo
Bedroom pop musicians
English people of Filipino descent